Kara-Tash is a village in Kara-Kulja District of Osh Region of Kyrgyzstan. Its population was 782 in 2021.

References

Populated places in Osh Region